Mülverstedt is a village and a former municipality in the Unstrut-Hainich-Kreis district of Thuringia, Germany. Since 1 January 2019, it is part of the municipality Unstrut-Hainich.

References

Unstrut-Hainich-Kreis
Former municipalities in Thuringia